The Poetry Society of Michigan (PSM) is a non-profit state-level poetry association in the U.S. state of Michigan, which is affiliated with the National Federation of State Poetry Societies (NFSPS). The organization promotes poetry, conducts monthly and annual contests, publishes poetry books and organizes periodic meetings, workshops and festivals.

History

The Poetry Society of Michigan was established in 1933 and incorporated as a 501(c)(3) nonprofit organization in 1976 in Cadillac, Michigan. The society's historical archives are housed at Clarke Historical Library Central Michigan University. The society currently has 11 affiliate chapters around the state.

Activities

The PSM sponsors annual poetry contests and encourages young people to read and write poetry. The organization holds regular meetings and events in the state during the spring, summer and fall. The society publishes the quarterly literary magazine Peninsula Poets, which showcases member and award winners' poetry, and a regular 5 -year anthology of members' work. Members' work is also published regularly on PSM's website.

References

External links

Poetry organizations
Literary societies
1933 establishments in Michigan
Non-profit organizations based in Michigan
501(c)(3) organizations
Arts organizations established in 1933